Slakbash (Slakpuś; , Iślaqbaş) is a rural locality (a selo) and the administrative centre of Slakbashevsky Selsoviet, Belebeyevsky District, Bashkortostan, Russia. The population was 551 as of 2010. There are 10 streets.

Geography 
Slakbash is located 30 km southeast of Belebey (the district's administrative centre) by road. Glukhovskaya is the nearest rural locality.

References

Links 
 Татьяна Ефремова: О Сильби, мекке чувашского народа на землях Башкорстана
 Виталий Станьял: Удар по башкирской Швейцарии
 Елена Ухсай: Современный вандализм, или Когда земля плачет
 Витус Неберинг: Экоконфликт превращается в национальную чуму

Rural localities in Belebeyevsky District